The 2018–19 Davidson Wildcats women's basketball team represented Davidson College during the 2018–19 NCAA Division I women's basketball season. The Wildcats were led by second year head coach Gayle Coats Fulks. The Wildcats are fifth year members of the Atlantic 10 Conference and played their home games at the John M. Belk Arena. They finished the season 17–15, 10–6 in A-10 play to finish in a tie for fourth place. They advanced to the quarterfinals of the A-10 women's tournament where they lost to Dayton. They received an invite to the WBI where they lost to Marshall.

Media

Davidson Wildcats Sports Network
All home games were featured on ESPN+, the new home of the Atlantic 10 Digital Network basketball package. Select away games were broadcast on an audio-only basis on the school's website. Derek Smith, who has been the play-by-play voice since the 2003–04 season, provided the call for all games with Sam Goldfarb providing color commentary for home games and Leslie Urban providing color commentary for away postseason games. Select games were televised.

Roster

Schedule

|-
!colspan=9 style=| Non-conference regular season

|-
!colspan=9 style=| Atlantic 10 regular season

|-
!colspan=9 style=| Atlantic 10 Women's Tournament

|-
!colspan=9 style=| WBI

See also
 2018–19 Davidson Wildcats men's basketball team

References

Davidson Wildcats women's basketball seasons
Davidson
Davidson Wildcats women's basketball
Davidson Wildcats women's basketball
Davidson